Saurashtra Cricket Association is the governing body of the cricket activities in the Saurashtra and Kutch region of the Gujarat state of India and the Saurashtra cricket team. It is affiliated to the Board of Control for Cricket in India.

History 
It was founded in 1950.

References

External links
Official website
History of cricket in Saurashtra

Cricket administration in India
Cricket in Gujarat
Sports organizations established in 1950
1950 establishments in Bombay State
Organisations based in Gujarat